This is a list of poets and writers writing in the Catalan language.

Medieval poets
Anselm Turmeda
Arnau March
Ausiàs March
Bernat Metge
Gabriel Móger
Gilabert de Próixita
Guerau de Maçanet
Jacme Rovira
Jacme Scrivà
Jaume March II
Jaume Safont
Joan Basset
Joan Roís de Corella
Jordi de Sant Jordi
Lluís d'Averçó
Lluís Icart
Lorenç Mallol
Melchior de Gualbes
Pau de Bellviure
Pere d'Abella
Pere March
Pere Miquel Carbonell
Pere de Queralt
Pere Tresfort
Ramon Llull

Early Modern Poets
Francesc Fontanella
Francesc Vicenç Garcia
Josep Romaguera
Juan Ramis

Romantic and Early Modernist ("Modernistes") poets
Jaume Agelat i Garrega
Joan Alcover
Miquel Costa i Llobera
Bonaventura Carles Aribau
Víctor Balaguer
Joaquín Bartrina
Manuel Milà i Fontanals
Àngel Guimerà
Joan Maragall
Alexandre de Riquer
Jacint Verdaguer

Modernist and contemporary poets
 Anna Aguilar-Amat (b. 1962)
 Joaquim Amat-Piniella
 Joan Brossa (1919–1998)
 Josep Carner (1884–1970)
 Salvador Dalí
 Ester Fenoll Garcia 
 Najat El Hachmi
 Quima Jaume i Carbó (1934–1993)
 Salvador Espriu
 Feliu Formosa
 Tomàs Garcés
 Joan Margarit i Consarnau
 Maria Mercè Marçal (1952-1998)
 Salvador Oliva i Llinàs
 Miquel Martí i Pol
 Josep Palau i Fabre
 Baltasar Porcel
 Carles Riba
 Carme Riera
 Bartomeu Rosselló-Pòrcel
 Joan Salvat-Papasseit
 Màrius Torres
 Jordi Valls i Pozo
 Olga Xirinacs Díaz

Catalan